Lapo da Castiglionchio the Elder (c. 1316 – 1381) was born in Rome. He was a correspondent and friend of Petrarch from 1350. A Tuscan noble of reduced fortune, Lapo da Castiglionchio the Elder was most known for being one of the leaders in the events leading up to the class revolt in Florence, the Revolt of the Ciompi, in 1378.

He was a legal professional and preserved the legal rights of certain notable families. Because of his defense for the special privileges of the aristocracy his family estate was burned during the uprisings of that revolt. He was eventually exiled from the Florence area.

His descendant, Lapo da Castiglionchio the Younger (c. 1405 – 1438), a pupil of the humanist Francesco Filelfo, wrote the scurrilous deadpan satiric dialogue on the papal curia, De curiae commodis (1438), "On the benefits of the Curia".

References

1381 deaths
Nobility from Rome
Popular revolt in late-medieval Europe
14th-century Italian nobility
Year of birth uncertain